Abetone Cutigliano is a comune (municipality) in the Province of Pistoia in the Italian region Tuscany . It was created in 2017 after the merger of the former communes of Abetone and Cutigliano.

References

External links
  Official website

Cities and towns in Tuscany